Tarek Riad (born 13 July 1960 in Cairo) is an Egyptian sport shooter. He competed in pistol shooting events at the Summer Olympics in 1992 and 2000.

Olympic results

References

1960 births
Living people
Sportspeople from Cairo
ISSF pistol shooters
Egyptian male sport shooters
Olympic shooters of Egypt
Shooters at the 1992 Summer Olympics
Shooters at the 2000 Summer Olympics